The 1971–72 Kentucky Colonels season was the fifth season of the Colonels in the American Basketball Association. The Colonels won 68 games on the season, en route to their first ever Division title, led by Issel and rookie Artis Gilmore, who like Issel signed a 10 years and $1.5 million contract. Gilmore won both ABA Rookie of the Year and ABA Most Valuable Player, averaging 23.8 points and 17.8 rebounds per game. However the Colonels were upset in 6 games by the New York Nets in the Division Semifinals. Notably, the Colonels played the Baltimore Bullets in the 2nd ever exhibition ABA vs. NBA game on September 22, 1971 in Louisville, Kentucky, winning 111-85.

Roster
 35 Darel Carrier – Shooting guard
 10 Louie Dampier – Point guard
 32 Mike Gale – Shooting guard	
 53 Artis Gilmore – Center
 4 Les Hunter – Power forward 
 44 Dan Issel – Center 
 22 Goose Ligon – Power forward
3 Jim O'Brien – Point guard
 9 Cincy Powell – Small forward 
 33 Mike Pratt – Shooting guard	 
15/30 Pierre Russell – Shooting guard	
 2 Walt Simon – Small forward 
 3/45 Howie Wright – Shooting guard

Final standings

Eastern Division

Playoffs
Eastern Division Semifinals

Colonels lose series, 4–2

Awards and honors
1972 ABA All-Star Game selections (game played on January 29, 1972 in Louisville, Kentucky)
Dan Issel (named MVP of the game)
Louie Dampier 
Artis Gilmore
Mullaney was selected to coach the Eastern Conference.

ABA Most Valuable Player Award: Artis Gilmore
Rookie of the Year: Artis Gilmore
All ABA-First Team selections
Dan Issel
Artis Gilmore
All ABA-Rookie Team selections
Artis Gilmore

References

 Colonels on Basketball Reference

External links
 RememberTheABA.com 1971-72 regular season and playoff results
 RememberTheABA.com Kentucky Colonels page

Kentucky Colonels seasons
Kentucky
Kentucky Colonels, 1971-72
Kentucky Colonels, 1971-72